Alice S. Huang (is an American biologist specialized in microbiology and virology. She served as President of AAAS during the 2010-2011 term.

Early years
Alice Huang's father, Quentin K. Y. Huang, was orphaned at age 12 in Anhui, China and was taken in by a missionary. He was later educated at the University of Pennsylvania and the Philadelphia Divinity School, returning to China as an Anglican bishop. He later married Huang's mother, Grace Betty Soong.

Alice Huang’s mother, Grace Betty Soong, was from Kiangsi Province where her family had large land holdings. Grace’s father appreciated the practical work of Christian missionaries and allowed several of his children to become Christian instead of remaining Buddhist.

Alice Huang was born in Nanchang, the capital city of Jiangxi Province, in 1939. Huang was raised Christian. Huang  emigrated to the U.S. in 1949.

She attended St. Mary's Hall-Doane Academy (in Burlington, New Jersey), the National Cathedral School (in Washington, D.C.), and Wellesley College (in Wellesley, Massachusetts). Huang received B.A., M.A., and Ph.D. (in microbiology in 1966) degrees all from Johns Hopkins University.

Career

Research 
Alice Huang's research focused on defective interfering particles (DIPs) which can be utilized to combat viruses. DIPs are composed of viral structural proteins and sets of DNA or RNA which are incomplete. These DIPs will interfere in replication of the virus because they are reproduced at the expense of a standard viral particle. Alice Huang's work on DIPs has been utilized to combat cancer, HIV, and plant related diseases.

At Johns Hopkins and MIT her work for Robert R. Wagner and future husband David Baltimore was "to purify and characterize interfering viral particles".  They studied the inhibition of cellular RNA synthesis by nonreplicating vesicular stomatitis virus, known to infect horses, cattle and swine.

At the time, biologists knew the central dogma to be DNA to RNA to protein, with DNA replication as the way to replicate ones genome. Dr. Huang and Dr. Baltimore unraveled that RNA viruses were different and used RNA polymerase to replicate its RNA genome, but they discovered an enzyme, reverse transcriptase (in a mouse leukemia retrovirus), that converts RNA to DNA (involved in a process now known as reverse transcription). Dr. Baltimore later received the Nobel Prize in 1975 for his discovery.

Huang and Baltimore coauthored a paper with Martha Stampfer titled "Ribonucleic acid synthesis of vesicular stomatitis virus, II. An RNA polymerase in the virion." This paper went on to show that “the virions of vesicular stomatitis virus contain an enzyme that catalyzes the incorporation of ribonucleotides into RNA”.
  
At Harvard Medical School, Huang continued to study how mutant strains produced by rabies-like virus interfered with further growth of the viral infection. In 1977, she was awarded the Eli Lilly Award in Microbiology and Immunology for this research.  From 1971 to 1991, Huang taught at Harvard Medical School.

Administration 

At Harvard, Huang served as coordinator of the Virology Unit at the Channing Laboratories of Infectious Diseases at Boston Medical Center for two years, and as director of the "Virus-Host Interactions in Cancer" training program (funded by the National Cancer Institute) for fifteen years.

Huang directed the Laboratories of Infectious Diseases at Boston Children's Hospital in 1979, where she studied viral diseases in pediatric patients. At New York University, Dr. Huang participated in a project in science education and received a grant that focused on improving teachers’ preparation and ability to engage students in science exploration and discovery.
 
Huang is an emeritus member of the Board of Trustees of the Keck Graduate Institute of Applied Life Sciences (KGI).

Huang is a former trustee of the Waksman Foundation for Microbiology and a trustee of the Public Agenda.  She was pointed a Council Member of the California Council on Science and Technology in 2004, and served for two terms.

Controversies 

In June 2015, Huang wrote a controversial advice article for the Science Careers website. A female postdoctoral scholar asked what she should do in response to her advisor looking down her shirt. Huang, who is married to her own postdoctoral advisor, replied, "I suggest you put up with it, with good humor if you can."

Following strong reaction on social media, the article was removed within hours of being posted. After the article was removed, Science Careers tweeted, "We apologize for printing it. It does not reflect our values or standards". A fuller apology claimed the article had not "undergone proper editorial review prior to posting."

In an interview, Huang stood by her advice, saying, "What I try to do is give advice from experience, and to give the advice that would serve the writer well into the long-term future. I’m taking their best interests to heart rather than being in one camp or another camp or trying to push my own political agendas." She said she hoped to write a follow-up column with other people’s suggestions for dealing with the situation.

Huang's explanation was criticized for implying that "being against sexual harassment is a 'camp' or political agenda."

Awards and honors

 1977 - Eli Lilly Award in Immunology and Microbiology (from the American Society for Microbiology)
 1982 - Doctor of Science (Honorary), Wheaton College
 1987 - Doctor of Science (Honorary), from Mount Holyoke College
 1991 - Doctor of Science (Honorary), Medical College of Pennsylvania
 1999 - Achievement Award (from the Chinese-American Faculty Association of Southern California)
 2001 - the Alice C. Evans Award (from the American Society for Microbiology)
 2015 - The Johns Hopkins University School of Medicine Distinguished Alumnus/Alumna Award

Professional Societies 

 1966 - Sigma Xi Honor Society, Johns Hopkins Chapter
 1967 - American Society for Microbiology (president 1989)
 1971 - American Association for the Advancement of Science (fellow, ‘00, president 2010)
 1974 - American Society for Biochemistry and Molecular Biology
 1978 - Association of Women in Science (fellow)
 1979 - Infectious Diseases Society of America (fellow)
 1981 - American Society for Virology
 1982 - American Academy of Microbiology (fellow)
 1988 - Society of Chinese Bioscientists of America
 1990 - Academia Sinica, Republic of China
 1990 - New York Academy of Sciences
 1995 - Pacific Council on International Policy

Personal life
Huang was married in 1968 to Dr. David Baltimore. They have one daughter.

References

1939 births
American women biologists
Chinese women biologists
Doane Academy alumni
Women virologists
20th-century American women scientists
21st-century American women scientists
American people of Chinese descent
Harvard University faculty
Johns Hopkins University alumni
Living people
American virologists
People from Nanchang
Biologists from Jiangxi
National Cathedral School alumni
Wellesley College alumni
Chinese science writers
Writers from Jiangxi
Chinese Civil War refugees
American women academics